Raffaello Baldini (1924 in Santarcangelo di Romagna – 2005 in Milan) was an Italian writer and poet. His Ad nòta (1995) won the Premio Bagutta.

Biography 

In the immediate postwar period, the young poets from Santarcangelo gathered at the Caffe Trieste, the bar owned by Baldini's parents. These students rechristened the bar "the Circle of Wisdom". This gave Baldini the opportunity of getting to know Tonino Guerra, Nino Pedretti, Gianni Fucci, Flavio Nicolini, Rina Macrelli and other artists from the neighbouring countryside.

He graduated in philosophy from the University of Bologna then spent some years teaching.

In 1955 he moved to Milan to work as a writer, and then as a journalist on Panorama (a magazine that started in 1962). In 1967 he published Autotem with Bompiani, a short opera satirising how cars are seen as a fetish. He self-published a collection of dialectical poetry É solitèri in 1976 in Imola. He published La nàiva (the snow) in 1982. He won the Viareggio Prize in 1988 with Furistír and the Bagutta Prize in 1995 with Ad nòta.

He also wrote for theatre. He wrote a monologue Zitti tutti!, published by Ubulibri in 1993. Ravenna Theatre produced the show Furistír, directed and adapted by Marco Martinelli, which was created as a fusion of eight collections of Baldini's poetry.

Works

Collections of poetry 

1976. É solitèri, Imola, Galeati. (Gabicce Prize)
1982. La nàiva, introduction by D. Isella, Torino, Einaudi. (Premio Carducci )
1988. Furistír, introduction by F. Brevini, Torino, Einaudi. (Premio Viareggio)
1995. Ad nòta, introduction by P. V. Mengaldo, Milano, Mondadori. (Bagutta Prize)
2000. Ciacri, Torino, Einaudi 
2003. Intercity, Torino, Einaudi.

Theatrical monologues 
 1993. Zitti tutti!, Torino, Einaudi.
 1998. Carta canta, Torino, Einaudi.
 2003. In fondo a destra, Torino, Einaudi.
 2004. La fondazione,Torino, Einaudi.

Translations in English 
 2001 Page Proof (Carta canta) Edited by Daniele Benati, Translated by Adria Bernardi. Boca Raton, Florida. Bordighera Press.
 2009 Small Talk (È solitèri, La nàiva, Furistír, Ciacri) edited and translated by Adria Bernardi. New York, Gradiva Publications.

Bibliografia
C. Martignoni, "Per non-finire. Sulla poesia di Raffaello Baldini", Campanotto Edition, 2004
G. Bellosi-M. Ricci (editor), "Lei capisce il dialetto? Raffaello Baldini tra poesia e teatro", Longo Edition, 2003
S. Crespi, "Poesia in versi romagnoli di Raffaello Baldini," in Otto Novecento, 1, Jan–Feb 1980, pp. 299–303;
F. Brevini, "L'apocalisse romagnola di Baldini," in the European magazine Nuova, 28 (March–May 1982), pp. 110–114; 
Manlio Cancogni, "Se il dialetto è un felice dialetto," from Il Giornale, 7 April 1984; 
 M. Bocchiola, "La coazione poetica per un labirinto romagnolo," in Autografo, 5, (June 1985); 
P. Civitareale, "Raffaello Baldini. Il borbottio infinito," in Oggi e domani, 24, n. 4, 1990, pp. 11–13;
L. Benini Sforza, "Elementi per una storia della poesia dialettale del secondo Novecento in Romagna," in Tratti, 36 (summer 1994); 
C. Marabini, "Spoon river in Romagna," in Il resto del Carlino, 22 August 1995; 
E.Siciliano, "Quanta verità nel suo dialetto," in L'Espresso, 26 November 1995; 
E. Zuccato. Recensione di Ad nòta, in Poesia, 91, January 1996, pp. 58–9.
Autori Vari, Voci Tre grandi poeti in musica, con Tonino Guerra e Nino Pedretti, Rimini, NdA Press, 2009, .

Italian male poets
1924 births
2005 deaths
People from Santarcangelo di Romagna
20th-century Italian poets
20th-century Italian male writers